Rahul Kumar Velpula (born 26 Jan 1989), known professionally as Roll Rida, is an Indian rapper, songwriter and actor in Telugu films and music.

He became popular with his YouTube rap song on Sankranthi, Patang, was a huge hit with over 17 million views. His other popular songs are Kirana rap, Breaking news Kattif, Shankar Ka Beta, Ivvalane Dilkush, Ignite, Arupu etc. In 2018, he appeared as a contestant for Bigg Boss 2 and successfully reached the 15th week of the show and finished in 6th place.

Early life
Roll Rida was born in Karimnagar, Telangana, India. He did his schooling at Johnson Grammar School in Hyderabad; intermediate at Narayana Junior College, Tarnaka and completed his BTech in computer science from CVR College of Engineering, Hyderabad. He was popular for his singing in school and started a band in college with Syed Kamran.

Career
Roll Rida initially worked at Google, Hyderabad and as Quality Analyst at Tech Mahindra.

He picked his professional name, Roll Rida, upon a friend's suggestion, after popular American rapper, Flo Rida, of Low song fame. He quit his job to pursue his successful singing career in 2017. His rap song ‘Arupu’ with Syed Kamran became popular. He was the first to do a rap song in Telugu language from Telangana State. In 2013, he debuted on Sankranthi with a single, Patang, on YouTube became a huge hit, with over 14 million views. His songs Patang, Kirana song, Dilkush are popular among young listeners. He toured USA in 2015 and 2016 to promote his Telugu rap and Hip Hop songs. Roll Rida was featured on VH1 in 2010.

He worked with Telugu music directors like M. M. Keeravani, S. S. Thaman and Anoop Rubens. He also performed with Divine. He worked as a voice artist for Akhil Akkineni in the film Manam, and Jr. NTR in Temper. He acted in a short film, Hello!, an urban rom com. It was released on YouTube. He was selected for Bigg Boss 2 for his popularity. He stayed in the house till the week before the finale of that season.

Artistry
Roll Rida's rapping is a combination of Hyderabadi Telugu and Deccani slang spoken in Hyderabad old city.

Discography

Singles/Music Videos

Telugu film songs

Filmography 
  90ML (2019)

References

External links 

Living people
Indian rappers
Indian male pop singers
Indian male playback singers
Singers from Telangana
People from Karimnagar district
Telugu playback singers
1989 births
Bigg Boss (Telugu TV series) contestants
Male actors in Telugu cinema